Orphulellini is a tribe of grasshoppers of the family Acrididae found in the Americas.

Genera

Dichromorpha Morse, 1896
Laplatacris Rehn, 1939
Orphulella Giglio-Tos, 1894
Orphulina Giglio-Tos, 1894

References 
 

Acrididae
Orthoptera tribes